Terra Nova High School is an American public high school in Pacifica in San Mateo County, California, United States. It serves grades 9 through 12 as part of the Jefferson Union High School District.

History
Terra Nova High School was established in 1961 to serve the growing population in the Linda Mar district of southern Pacifica.  Students attended from Vallemar, Rockaway Beach, Mori Point, Fairway, Sharp Park and Pacific Manor districts until Oceana High School was completed the following year.

Campus
The original buildings and campus were designed by Mark Falk & Corwin Booth (of Falk & Booth). The  main building originally had only two stories when the school opened in 1961. Portables were added to the rear of the school campus to accommodate the increase in students and need for more classrooms.  A major facilities remodel was completed in 1998, and construction of a 400+ seat theater and a new science building began in early 2010 and was completed in 2012.

Demographics

According to U.S. News & World Report, 62% of Terra Nova's student body is "of color," with 22% of the student body coming from economically disadvantaged households, determined by student eligibility for California's Reduced-price meal program.

Academics

Curriculum

Terra Nova offers Advanced Placement courses in US History, European History, Chemistry, Biology, Environmental Science, US Government, Language and Composition, Literature, Studio Art, Music Theory, and Calculus AB.

Standardized testing

In 2011, Terra Nova scored an API of 801, the sixth highest in San Mateo County. By 2013, the last year on record, the school had scored 792, the second highest in the Jefferson Union school district.

The state of California replaced the API system with the California School Dashboard system in 2017, in order to provide "a fuller picture of how districts and schools are addressing the needs of their students while also identifying the specific strengths and areas in need of improvement."

For the school year 2018–2019, Terra Nova scored 6.3 points above the state average in English Language Arts, but 40.4 points below standard in Math. It ranked above average for both Campus Climate - with an annual suspension rate of 5.6% - and Academic Engagement - with a graduation rate (measured by the percentage who received a high school diploma within 4–5 years of entering 9th grade or completed their graduation requirements at an alternative school) of 94.7%.

Extracurricular activities 

Terra Nova has an award-winning marching band, which won first place in their division at the Foothill Band Review in 2007 and 2009. The marching band received the Sweepstakes award at the 2008 and 2009 Fog Fests. Most recently the marching band won 2nd place at championships 2016 in Napa

The Terra Nova drama department performs spring and fall productions, often produced in conjunction with directors from the local theatre company, the Pacifica Spindrift Players.

The school's student-run newspaper is the Terra Nova Times and has won awards from the Peninsula Press Club.

Terra Nova has had a team on the Bay Area's Quiz Kids show since the show's debut.

Terra Nova also offers a wide variety of sports, including football, baseball, cheer leading, badminton, cross country, tennis, track and field, water polo, swimming, soccer, basketball, volleyball, and wrestling. Numerous teams have won PAL championships yearly and CCS.

FOOTBALL -CIF CCS Championships

1982- II North Head Coach Bob Lotti - Terra Nova(11-1) 27-6 vs.Westmoor(7-4)

1988- II North Head Coach Mike Gunning - Terra Nova(9-3) 7-6 vs. Carlmont(10-2)

2010- Division III Head Coach Bill Gray - Terra Nova(9-4) 35-13 vs. Monterey(11-2)

2014- Division IV Head Coach Tim Adams - Terra Nova(7-6) 43-23 vs. Monte Vista Christian(10-3)

Baseball has sent several players to the Majors, including Greg Reynolds, Bob McClure, and Keith Hernandez (11-time 1st Base Rawlings Gold Glove Award winner, Major League Baseball All-Star Game player, and hitting champ for several years).

Notable alumni

 Mike Buskey, Class of 1967, former Major League Baseball player for Philadelphia Phillies
 Keith Hernandez, attended during his freshman year in 1967-1968 but transferred to nearby Capuchino High School for the remainder of his high school years; Major League Baseball first baseman for the St. Louis Cardinals and New York Mets
 Bob McClure, Class of 1970, Major League Baseball relief pitcher for seven teams, most prominently the Milwaukee Brewers
 Rob Schneider, Class of 1982, actor, comedian, and screenwriter
 Sara Zarr, Class of 1988, writer
 Mike Lockwood, Class of 1989, professional Wrestler
 Greg Reynolds, Class of 2003, the Colorado Rockies' No. 1 draft choice in 2006 (Major League Baseball), and Rockies starting pitcher in the 2008 season
 Eugene Gu, Class of 2004, Physician-scientist and CEO of the Ganogen Research Institute
 Anthony Gordon, Class of 2015, Quarterback for the Denver Broncos formerly for Washington State University

See also 
 San Mateo County high schools

References

External links 
 Terra Nova High School website
 Terra Nova High School sports page
 JUHSD website
 Great Schools profile
 Terra Nova Robotics

Jefferson Union High School District schools
Educational institutions established in 1961
Pacifica, California
High schools in San Mateo County, California
Public high schools in California
1961 establishments in California